Awake is the third studio album by American singer-songwriter Josh Groban. Announced on September 13, 2006, it is his third studio album, and a follow-up to his multi-platinum album Closer. Awake was released on November 7, 2006.

The album was certified 2× platinum in the US by the RIAA on January 31, 2008, and has sold 2.3 million albums as of October 2015. It is the third top selling classical album of the 2000s in the US, according to Nielsen SoundScan.

Album information
The album's first single is "You Are Loved (Don't Give Up)". The album features producers Imogen Heap, Marius De Vries, Guy Sigsworth, Eric Mouquet, Glen Ballard, and David Foster (who also worked on previous Groban works). As with all Josh Groban albums, songs on Awake are performed in English, Italian and Spanish. The album offered a more modern vibe to his voice by using more instruments aside from the occasional classic piano accompaniment in his previous albums. The album also featured Groban's head voice technique as evident in most of the tracks in the album.

Awake additionally features tracks that credit Groban's recent movements in South Africa. "Lullaby" and "Weeping" (album tracks 11 and 12) are sung by him in conjunction with the renowned South African musical group Ladysmith Black Mambazo, with further contributions from Vusi Mahlasela and Dave Matthews. "Weeping", a pop song originally composed in South Africa, is thematically oriented with the country's history of Apartheid. "Lullaby" is a track included in the album as a supplement to "Weeping", considered one of the album's major highlights. "Lullaby" is meant to flow gaplessly into "Weeping", but the rest of the album uses gaps. The song "Now or Never" was produced and co-written with English singer-songwriter Imogen Heap.

"You Are Loved (Don't Give Up)" peaked at No. 9 on the Hot Adult Contemporary Tracks chart, while "February Song" and "Awake" each peaked at No. 13 on the same chart.

Track listing

Notes
  signifies a vocal producer
  signifies a co-producer

Bonus track listing
"You Raise Me Up" (Brendan Graham, Rolf Løvland) (European bonus track) – 4:50
"Verità" (Richard Page, Per Magnusson, David Kreuger) (Special edition bonus track) – 4:01
"Awake" (Groban, Mouquet, Salter) (Special edition bonus track) – 5:11
"Smile" (Charlie Chaplin, Geoffrey Parsons, John Turner) (Website exclusive) – 3:43

Personnel
 Josh Groban – vocals, drums, keyboards, piano, backing vocals
 Vinnie Colaiuta – drums
 Joel Shearer – guitar
 Frank Ricotti – percussion, vibraphone
 Jochem van der Saag – synthesizer, programming
 Glen Ballard – keyboards
 Blair Sinta – percussion
 Michael Thompson – guitar
 Ian Thomas – drums
 Eric Mouquet – keyboards
 Nathan East – bass guitar
 Chris Elliott – piano, dulcimer
 Vincent Nguini – guitar
 Sean Hurley – drums
 Bakithi Kumalo – bass guitar, backing vocals
 David Foster – keyboards
 Marius de Vries – keyboards, programming, piano
 Ramon Stagnaro – guitar
 Matt Chamberlain – drums
 Herbie Hancock – electric piano
 Tim Pierce – guitar
 Jason Boshoff – programming
 Anton Fig – drums
 Trevor Barry – bass guitar
 Kaitlyn Barton – tambourine
 Zac Rae – keyboards
 Alexis Smith – additional programming
 Dean Parks – guitar
 Fiona Hibbert – harp
 Imogen Heap – piano, programming, kalimba
 Anna Ross – backing vocals
 Ladysmith Black Mambazo – backing vocals
 Vusi Mahlasela – backing vocals
 Susie Suh – backing vocals

Charts

Weekly charts

Year-end charts

Certifications

References
General references
Press release

Specific references

External links
 
 

2006 albums
Josh Groban albums
Albums produced by Glen Ballard
Albums produced by David Foster
Albums produced by Marius de Vries
143 Records albums
Reprise Records albums